The Orleans County Monitor was a weekly newspaper published in Barton, Vermont from January 8, 1872, to 1953. It was published by Ellery H. Webster in 1872. An American Civil War veteran, he named it after the USS Monitor. George H. Blake published the paper in 1877. The circulation was 1,400.  Wallace Harry Gilpin owned the paper from 1904 to 1953.

Footnotes

External links
Newspaper Pages (1872-1912) on Chronicling America

Orleans County Monitor, The
Orleans County Monitor, The
Defunct newspapers published in Vermont
1872 establishments in Vermont
1953 disestablishments in Vermont
Publications established in 1872
Publications disestablished in 1953